Christopher John Morton, MBE (born 22 July 1956) is a former motorcycle speedway rider. He rode bikes from a young age at the farm of Peter Collins' parents.

Brief career summary
Born in Davyhulme, Lancashire, Morton made his debut for Ellesmere Port Gunners (on loan from Belle Vue Aces) on 15 May 1973. He showed rapid improvement then following an injury to Aces Captain Chris Pusey in June 1973 he was drafted into the Belle Vue team scoring 6 points on his debut in an away meeting at Cradley Heath. The following season he became British Under-21 Champion at just 17 years of age.

During the late 1970s, Morton was a guest resident international rider at the famous Rowley Park Speedway in Adelaide, South Australia where he often rode against the likes of home town hero John Boulger and Mildura's Phil Crump.

He rode for the England team at test level and represented them in the World Team Cup, winning the competition in 1980.

Morton became British Champion in 1983 and World Pairs Champion with best friend Peter Collins in 1984.

After retirement
He retired from riding in 1990, becoming manager of Berwick Bandits in 1991. He also played a major role in the introduction of speedway to Buxton in 1994.

In 2005 he returned to Belle Vue as commercial manager and then in December 2006 he was part of a consortium who bought the Aces and currently holds the position of Operations Director, having previously also acted as team manager.

He was awarded his MBE for services to speedway in 1992.

Brother Dave was also a speedway rider.

World Final Appearances

Individual World Championship
 1976 -  Chorzów, Silesian Stadium - 11th - 6pts
 1980 -  Gothenburg, Ullevi - 9th - 8pts
 1981 -  London, Wembley Stadium - 11th - 5pts
 1983 -  Norden, Motodrom Halbemond - 10th - 7pts
 1986 -  Chorzów, Silesian Stadium - 9th - 8pts
 1987 -  Amsterdam, Olympic Stadium - 13th - 9pts
 1988 -  Vojens, Speedway Center - 10th - 6pts

World Pairs Championship
 1981 -  Chorzów, Silesian Stadium (with Dave Jessup) - 6th - 17pts (10)
 1984 -  Lonigo, Pista Speedway (with Peter Collins) - Winner - 27pts (14)

World Team Cup
 1980 -  Wrocław, Olympic Stadium (with Michael Lee / Peter Collins / Dave Jessup) - Winner - 40pts (11)
 1981 -  Olching, Olching Speedwaybahn (with Dave Jessup / Kenny Carter / John Davis / Gordon Kennett) - 2nd - 29pts (11)
 1983 -  Vojens, Speedway Center (with Kenny Carter / Michael Lee / Dave Jessup / Peter Collins) - 2nd - 29pts (7)
 1984 -  Leszno, Alfred Smoczyk Stadium (with Peter Collins / Simon Wigg / Phil Collins / Neil Collins) - 2nd - 24pts (4)
 1986 -  Gothenburg, Ullevi,  Vojens, Speedway Center,  Bradford, Odsal Stadium (with Simon Wigg / Kelvin Tatum / Jeremy Doncaster / Neil Evitts / Marvyn Cox) - 3rd - 81pts (20)
 1988 -  Long Beach, Veterans Memorial Stadium (with Simon Wigg / Simon Cross / Kelvin Tatum / Gary Havelock) - 4th - 22pts (4)

World Longtrack Championship

Finalist

 1980 -  Scheeßel 5pts (14th)
 1982 -  Esbjerg 4pts (14th)
 1985 -  Esbjerg 0pts (20th) Reserve
 1987 -  Muhldorf 2pts (17th)
 1988 -  Scheeßel 31pts (Third)
 1989 -  Marianske Lazne 8pts (15th)

References

External links
 http://grasstrackgb.co.uk/chris-morton/

1956 births
Living people
British speedway riders
English motorcycle racers
British Speedway Championship winners
Speedway promoters
Members of the Order of the British Empire
People from Davyhulme
Speedway World Pairs Champions
Belle Vue Aces riders
Sheffield Tigers riders
Ellesmere Port Gunners riders